"I'm Feeling Kind of Lucky Tonight" is a single by Canadian country music artist Charlie Major. Released in 1997, it was the first single from Major's album Everything's Alright. The song reached #1 on the RPM Country Tracks chart in December 1997.

Chart performance

Year-end charts

References

1997 singles
Charlie Major songs
Songs written by Charlie Major
ViK. Recordings singles